Mega Man: Fully Charged is an animated television series based on the Japanese video game series of the same name published by Capcom. The series was developed by Man of Action Studios and produced by Dentsu Entertainment USA and DHX Studios Vancouver for Cartoon Network  and Family Chrgd. It is the fourth television series based on the franchise, and the second to draw inspiration from the "Classic" series after the 1994 cartoon. It premiered in the United States on August 5, 2018, after the first ten episodes were first released on-demand on August 3.

Synopsis
The series follows Aki Light, an advanced robot who looks like and lives the routine of a human schoolboy. He was built by scientist Dr. Light as his son and lives with his biologically human sister Suna Light. They live in Silicon City, a town co-inhabited by robots and humans rather peacefully, though is currently seeing new attacks from rogue robots (the Robot Masters of the franchise). Aki responds by transforming into "Mega Man" and battles to neutralize the threat and protect the civilians from harm. Allies to Mega Man include Mega Mini, a wise-cracking miniature robot who operates within his forehead, his pet Rush the robot dog, and Suna Light. Other characters include Sgt. Night, a war veteran who gives anti-robot speeches (though works with the rogue robots to reignite a human-robot war) and Bert Wily, a classmate and friend to Aki Light.

Characters

Mega Man (voiced by Vincent Tong) – The protagonist and hero of Silicon City. Aki Light is a robot boy who looks like a regular human, and with the ability to transform into his superhero identity of Mega Man. He can fire energy blasts from his arm cannon and has the ability to replicate the schematics of other robots in order to copy their abilities while having the personalities of some of them as a side-effect. While he can act cocky at times, he cares deeply for his family and friends and will risk his life to protect them to the best of his ability. He is considered highly advanced due to his power set.
 Mega Mini (voiced by Ryan Beil) – Aki's mechanic and sidekick of sorts who powers his armor and gives him his abilities. He occasionally pops out of his head to speak and loves to make wisecracks. What started off as animosity for Blasto Woman after getting kidnapped by her, has turned into a full on crush that seems to be reciprocated.
 Suna Light (voiced by Caitlyn Bairstow) – Aki's human sister and ally. She is the one of the few who knows about Aki's double identity. She is intelligent and has numerous gadgets at her disposal to aid her "ro-bro".
Dr. Thomas Light (voiced by Garry Chalk) – Aki's father and a supporter of human/robot relations. In "Panic in the Lighthouse," it is revealed that he has always known of his son's double identity which he makes Aki know of after using the Mega Key to heal Chaotique.
Rush – The Light family's robot dog. He eventually gets his own armor and becomes Mega Man's sidekick.

Production and development
On June 2, 2015, Capcom partnered with Dentsu Entertainment USA to create a 26-episode animated television series of the company's flagship Mega Man video game franchise after 20 years since the 1994 animated series of the same name had its final run. Under terms of the deal, Dentsu Entertainment holds worldwide broadcast and licensing rights for all aspects of the new Mega Man TV series and handpicks American writing team Man of Action (Joe Casey, Joe Kelly, Duncan Rouleau and Steven T. Seagle), the creators of Ben 10 and Generator Rex, to create, write and executive produce the show.

At the Long Beach Comic Con 2015, Duncan Rouleau gave out more details regarding the show's combination of game-based and new material such as the backstories of some characters being different with "a few surprises," creating both new major and minor villains other than Dr. Wily and the Robot Masters and including Easter eggs for fans, while still focusing the show for a new audience. Man of Action also noted they've been working closely with Dentsu Entertainment and Capcom, trying to write stories that will appeal more to western audiences. They also confirmed that the art-style would be much closer to how the characters appear in the games and Capcom's official art rather than the more superhero-like designs of the 1994 cartoon, as noted by Rouleau regarding the visual appearance of Mega Man himself "The Mega Man that you knew and fell in love with is still going to be the same Mega Man. He's going to be the younger version of him, because there are so many variations of who he could be, but we're going with the total, squat, awesome, big-boot, big-gun Mega Man".

On May 26, 2016, DHX Media announced that they would be co-producing the series with Dentsu, as well as handling distribution and licensing for it outside of Asia. An image of the first iteration of the show's design for Mega Man was released alongside the announcement. Later that year, Nerdist conducted an interview with the Man of Action creative crew, where it was said that Mega Man would be "optimistic" in this series, with the show's visual aesthetic drawn by Rouleau in conjunction with Capcom with inspiration by older anime shows like Gigantor and Speed Racer. The outlet initially reported that the series would air on Disney XD, but that was later retracted with Dentsu stating a broadcast on the channel was never confirmed. In late January 2017, footage from an incarnation of the series with the same design leaked through a demo reel posted by animation studio Film Roman. This was later removed, with a representative from Dentsu Entertainment describing it as an internal animation test not reflective of the show's current look.

On April 3, 2017, Dentsu and DHX announced that the series was delayed to 2018 and would premiere on Cartoon Network in the United States (making it the third series based on the franchise to air on the network, after MegaMan NT Warrior and Mega Man Star Force) and Family Chrgd in Canada. It was then revealed that the series would be animated by DHX Studios Vancouver, utilizing computer generated imagery with a heavily revised design. The next month, Jakks Pacific signed on to produce toys based on the series.

At the 2018 Licensing Expo, DHX Media's promotion for the series listed the series under the new title Mega Man: Fully Charged. The show held its premiere at the 2018 San Diego Comic-Con on July 20. The series officially debuted on television in the United States on August 5, 2018, with the first 10 episodes available through on-demand platforms on August 3. Reruns began airing on Boomerang in the United States on August 12. The series was removed from both channels' schedules after 10 weeks, though it eventually returned the following January. The Canadian Family Chrgd broadcast began on September 8, 2018. It premiered on Pop in the United Kingdom on October 1, 2018. In Southeast Asia, the series debuted on Disney XD on June 3, 2019. An Australian premiere on 9Go! followed on July 15.

Episodes

Comic book miniseries
On May 19, 2020, it was announced that the series would be continued as a six-issue comic book miniseries written by creators A. J. Marchisello and Marcus Rinehart, drawn by Stefano Simeone, and published by Boom! Studios.

Notes

References

External links

 

2010s American animated television series
2010s American science fiction television series
2010s Canadian animated television series
2010s Canadian science fiction television series
2018 American television series debuts
2018 Canadian television series debuts
2019 American television series endings
2019 Canadian television series endings
American children's animated action television series
American children's animated adventure television series
American children's animated science fantasy television series
American children's animated superhero television series
Canadian children's animated action television series
Canadian children's animated adventure television series
Canadian children's animated science fantasy television series
Canadian children's animated superhero television series
Anime-influenced Western animated television series
English-language television shows
Cartoon Network original programming
Man of Action Studios
Dentsu
Animated series based on Mega Man
Television series by DHX Media
Television series by Film Roman
Animated television series about robots